Bharati Vidyapeeth Institute of Technology (BVIT) is a polytechnic college in Navi Mumbai. It is located in CBD Belapur, but closer to Kharghar, being situated opposite to the Kharghar railway station. The educational institution is affiliated to MSBTE. It offers diploma courses of three years duration based on the semester pattern in various fields to students who have passed SSC or HSC.

References

External links
Bharati Vidyapeeth Institute of Technology (BVIT)

Education in Navi Mumbai
Engineering colleges in Mumbai